The Sheldon–Primghar Hyphens were a minor league baseball team based in Sheldon, Iowa, also representing neighboring Primghar, Iowa. In 1902, the Sheldon team played as members of the Class D level Iowa-South Dakota League, with the Hyphens following in 1903. The teams hosted home minor league games at Sheldon City Park.

History
The 1902 Sheldon team was the first minor league baseball team based in Sheldon, Iowa. Sheldon became charter members of the six–team Iowa-South Dakota League in 1902. Sheldon finished the Iowa–South Dakota League regular season with a 14–71 record, placing last in the regular season standings, playing the season under managers H.M. Moser, Mickie Jamison, Frank Albertson and Artie Ward. The Sheldon team hosted home minor league games at Sheldon City Park.

Sheldon placed 6th in the 1902 Iowa-South Dakota League standings with their 14–71 record. Sheldon finished behind the Flandreau Indians (51–19), Le Mars Blackbirds (43–48), Rock Rapids Browns (32–59), Sioux City Cornhuskers (56–40) and the champion Sioux Falls Canaries (65–24). Sheldon finished 49.0 games behind Sioux Falls in the final standings. The Sheldon franchise folded after the season, being replaced by the Council Bluffs Bluffers in the Iowa–South Dakota League. The Rock Rapids and Flandreau franchises also folded following the 1902 season.

In 1903, Sheldon regained a team in the four–team Iowa–South Dakota League during the season. On June 20, 1903, the Council Bluffs Bluffers withdrew from the Iowa–South Dakota League with a record of 1–22. The team was transferred to Sheldon–Primghar, as the franchise added neighboring Primghar to the franchise structure. The Sheldon–Primghar team was awarded a record of 14–11, when beginning play on June 25, 1903.

The newly named "Sheldon–Primghar Hyphens" finished 44–35 overall, placing 2nd in the 1903 Iowa–South Dakota League standings and finishing 2.5 games behind the champion Le Mars Blackbirds. John McBurney and Bud Jones were the 1903 managers in Sheldon after Buck Keith managed the team in Council Bluffs. The team moniker was a reference to the combined names of the towns. Primghar, Iowa is 10 miles southeast of Sheldon, Iowa. The Iowa–South Dakota League permanently folded following the 1903 season.

Sheldon and Primghar have not hosted another minor league franchise.

The ballpark
The Sheldon and Sheldon–Primghar Hyphens teams played home games at Sheldon City Park. Today, the park still exists as a city park with softball fields. Sheldon City Park is located off Park Street (US 18) between 4th Avenue & 6th Avenue, Sheldon, Iowa.

Timeline

Year–by–year records

Notable alumni
No Sheldon or Sheldon–Primghar Hyphens players advanced to play major league baseball.

References

External links
Baseball Reference

Defunct minor league baseball teams
Professional baseball teams in Iowa
Defunct baseball teams in Iowa
Baseball teams established in 1902
Baseball teams disestablished in 1903
O'Brien County, Iowa
Sioux County, Iowa
Sheldon, Iowa
Iowa-South Dakota League teams
1902 establishments in Iowa
1903 disestablishments in Iowa